Lamphun Airport  is located inside the area of the Saha Industrial Park. This airfield was designed to meet ICAO recommendations and is approved by the DOA. Runway 01/19 is level, well-graded laterite surface and usable even during the wet season.

The final approach from both directions is straightforward. There are high voltage electricity pylons less than 1 km south of runway 19 and several aerial masts 1345' AMSL to the 2 km NE of airfield.  There are houses and trees close to threshold of runway 01 reducing the available landing distance on this runway.

References

External links

Airports in Thailand
Buildings and structures in Lamphun province